Allen E. Fox (born June 25, 1939) is an  American former tennis player in the 1960s and 1970s who went on to be a college coach and author.  He was ranked as high as U.S. No. 4 in 1962, and was in the top ten in the U.S. five times between 1961 and 1968.

In 1960, he won the National Collegiate Athletics Association (NCAA) doubles title with Larry Nagler for the University of California at Los Angeles.  In 1961, Fox won the NCAA singles title. In 1962 he won the US National Hard Court title. He won a gold medal in singles at the 1965 Maccabiah Games in Israel. At the 1969 Maccabiah Games he won gold medals in singles and doubles.

Fox was elected to the Intercollegiate Tennis Association Hall of Fame, the Southern California Jewish Sports Hall of Fame, the Southern California Tennis Association Hall of Fame, and the UCLA Athletics Hall of Fame.

Tennis career
Fox attended Beverly Hills High School, and played tennis for the school.

In 1960, he won the National Collegiate Athletics Association (NCAA) doubles title with Larry Nagler for the University of California at Los Angeles (UCLA).  In 1961, as team captain, Fox won the NCAA singles title, beating Ray Senkowski of Michigan, 6–1, 6–2, and 6–4. He only lost twice in dual match play while in college, to Rafael Osuna and Chuck McKinley.  He was named All-American in 1959, 1960, and 1961, and was named All-UCLA and All-University of California Athlete of the Year.  Fox helped lead UCLA to NCAA team championships in 1960 and 1961. He graduated from UCLA with a B.A. in physics in 1961, and later earned a Ph.D. there in psychology in 1968.

When he graduated, Fox was the 4th-ranked singles player in the United States.  He won the singles title at Cincinnati in 1961.  He won also the 1962 US National Hard Court title.  That year, he reached the singles final in Cincinnati, falling to Marty Riessen.

In 1965 he won the Ojai Tennis Tournament in men's singles.  In 1965 he reached the quarterfinals at Wimbledon.

In 1966, he won the Canadian Nationals and the (40th annual) Los Angeles Open, formerly known as the Pacific Southwest Championships, as a graduate student, beating the then-current champions of all four Major Slams – Manuel Santana (Wimbledon), Fred Stolle (U.S.), Tony Roche (French), and Roy Emerson (Australian), in the finals.

Maccabiah Games
Fox is Jewish.

He won a gold medal at the 1965 Maccabiah Games in Israel.

Four years later, he was back at the 1969 Maccabiah Games as the top seed, and again won the gold medal, this time defeating South African Julian Krinsky in the men's individual semi-finals and South African Davis Cup player Jack Saul in the finals. In doubles, he and partner Ronald Goldman won the gold medal after they defeated Americans Tom Karp and Peter Fishbach in the semifinals, and then Americans Ed Rubinoff and Leonard Schloss in the finals.

Davis Cup
He was named to the U.S. Davis Cup team in 1961, 1962, and 1966.  He played 2 singles matches, winning both of them without giving up more than 2 games in any of the 6 sets that he played.

Halls of Fame
Fox was elected to the Intercollegiate Tennis Association Hall of Fame as a player and a coach in 1988.  In 1991, he was inducted into the Southern California Jewish Sports Hall of Fame.

He was inducted into the Southern California Tennis Association Hall of Fame in 2002.  Fox was also inducted into the UCLA Athletics Hall of Fame in 2005.

Coaching
Fox coached the Pepperdine University men's tennis team, at the highest level-Division 1, for 17 years.  His teams, which included Brad Gilbert, reached the NCAA finals twice, the semifinals three times, and the quarterfinals six times.  In his career, he coached his teams to a 368–108 won-lost record between 1979 and 1995; the .778 winning percentage is the best in Pepperdine tennis history. He was named to the Intercollegiate Tennis Coaches Hall of Fame  and, aside from Gilbert, coached players such as Robbie Weiss (NCAA singles winner), Kelly Jones (NCAA doubles winner and world No. 1 doubles player), and Martin Laurendeau (Captain of the Canadian Davis Cup Team).

Writing and videos
Fox has worked as a broadcaster, writer, and lecturer. He has authored several books, including Think to Win:  The Strategic Dimension of Tennis (1993),  If I'm The Better Player, Why Can't I Win?, and The Winner's Mind: A Competitor's Guide to Sports and Business Success.  He is a former editor of Tennis Magazine.

Allen has published two videos, titled Allen Fox's Ultimate Tennis Lesson (2001) and Allen Fox's Ultimate Tennis Drills (2001).

Personal
Fox has two sons, Evan and Charlie, and lives in San Luis Obispo, California, with his wife Nancy.

See also
 List of Jews in sports#Tennis

References

External links
 Official site
 
 
 

1939 births
Living people
American male tennis players
American tennis coaches
Beverly Hills High School alumni
Pepperdine Waves men's tennis coaches
UCLA Bruins men's tennis players
Tennis players from Los Angeles
Jewish American sportspeople
Jewish tennis players
Maccabiah Games gold medalists for the United States
Competitors at the 1965 Maccabiah Games
Competitors at the 1969 Maccabiah Games
Maccabiah Games medalists in tennis
Universiade medalists in tennis
Universiade gold medalists for the United States
Universiade bronze medalists for the United States
Medalists at the 1965 Summer Universiade
Tennis players at the 1963 Pan American Games
Pan American Games competitors for the United States
21st-century American Jews